Samuel or Sam Hayes may refer to:

Sam Hayes (news reader), New Zealand news reader
Samuel E. Hayes Jr. (born 1940), former member of the Pennsylvania House of Representatives
Sir Samuel Hayes, 1st Baronet (1737–1807), MP for Augher and of the Hayes baronets
Sir Samuel Hayes, 2nd Baronet (1773–1827)
Sir Samuel Hercules Hayes, 4th Baronet (1840–1901)
Samuel Hayes (settler) (1641–1712), early settler of Norwalk, Connecticut
Samuel Snowden Hayes (1820–1880), Illinois politician
Samuel W. Hayes (1875-1941)

See also
Samuel Hays (disambiguation)
Samuel Ross Hay (1865–1944), American Methodist bishop